The year 2013 was marked in science fiction by the following events.

Events

 November, 23: 50th anniversary of the Doctor Who franchise. It was highlighted by the release of The Day of the Doctor special episode, Doctor Who 50 years trailer, and fan celebrations worldwide.

Deaths

 May 26 – Jack Vance, American writer (b. 1916 in science fiction)
 June 8 – John Boyd, American writer (b. 1919)
 June 9 – Iain M. Banks, Scottish writer (b. 1954)
 June 23 – Richard Matheson, American writer (b. 1926)
 July 10 – Gokulananda Mahapatra, Indian writer (b. 1922)
 September 2 – Frederik Pohl, American writer (b. 1919)

Literature
Earth Afire by Orson Scott Card
Abaddon's Gate by James S.A. Corey
Nichts von euch auf Erden by Reinhard Jirgl
The Long War by Terry Pratchett and Stephen Baxter

Films
After Earth
Coherence
The Colony
The Congress
Dark Skies
Elysium
Ender's Game
Europa Report
Gravity
Her
The Hunger Games: Catching Fire
The Last Days on Mars
Pacific Rim
Oblivion
Riddick
Snowpiercer
Star Trek Into Darkness

TV
 Defiance, season 1
 Doctor Who 2013 specials
 Falling Skies, season 3
 Orphan Black, season 1
 Revolution, season 2
 Rick and Morty
 Steven Universe
 The Tomorrow People
 Under the Dome, season 1

Awards

Locus Award
 Best Science Fiction Novel - Redshirts by John Scalzi

Nebula Award
Best novel: 2312 by Kim Stanley Robinson

Ray Bradbury Award: Alfonso Cuarón and Jonás Cuarón for Gravity

Saturn Award 

Best science fiction film: The Avengers

References

 Science fiction by year
Fiction set in 2013